Duilio Setti (Modena, January 7, 1912 - Modena, December 8, 1972) was an Italian professional football player.

Honours
 Serie A champion: 1937/38, 1939/40.
 Coppa Italia winner: 1938/39

1912 births
Year of death missing
Sportspeople from Modena
Italian footballers
Serie A players
Modena F.C. players
S.S.C. Bari players
Inter Milan players
U.C. Sampdoria players
Parma Calcio 1913 players
Association football defenders
Vigevano Calcio players
Footballers from Emilia-Romagna